Rhodonyx rubescens is a species of  tropical air-breathing land snail, a pulmonate gastropod mollusk in the family Amphibulimidae.

Distribution 
Rhodonyx rubescens has been reported by various workers from Guadeloupe, Marie-Galante, Dominica and Martinique. It is assumed now that this taxon is endemic to Martinique and all other reports are misidentifications.

References
This article incorporates CC-BY-3.0 text from the reference 

 Schileyko, A. A. (1999). Treatise on Recent Terrestrial Pulmonate Molluscs, Part 3: Partulidae, Ailllyidae, Bulimulidae, Orthalicidae, Megaspiridae, Urocoptidae. Ruthenica. Supplement 2: 263-436.

Amphibulimidae
Gastropods described in 1830